Chapleau Airport  is located  southeast of Chapleau, Ontario, Canada.

See also
Chapleau Water Aerodrome

References

External links
Page about this airport on COPA's Places to Fly airport directory

Certified airports in Ontario
Transport in Sudbury District
Buildings and structures in Sudbury District